Jill Megan Kortleve (born 5 November 1988) is a Dutch fashion model. She is known for being an exclusive face in Alexander McQueen's Spring/Summer 2019 show. She is best known for her work with Chanel.

Career
Kortleve was born and raised in the Netherlands and is of Dutch, Indonesian and Indian descent. Her father, Jan Willem Kortleve, is Dutch, while her mother, Chequita Lachmann, is Surinamese and is of Indonesian and Indian descent. She was originally discovered as a model by her best friend, who founded the agency The Movement Models in Amsterdam. In 2020, she walked the Chanel runway during Paris Fashion Week; she was the first plus-size model to do so since 2010, when Crystal Renn modeled for the company. She has also walked for Alexander McQueen, Michael Kors, Fendi, Jacquemus, Valentino, Mugler, Rag & Bone, Prabal Gurung, Simone Rocha, and Kate Spade.

Kortleve appeared on the cover of different national issues of Vogue, including Vogue France, British Vogue, Vogue Italia, American Vogue, Vogue Netherlands, Vogue España, . and Vogue Russia in November 2021.

References

Living people
Dutch female models
Dutch people of Indian descent
Dutch people of Indonesian descent
Dutch people of Surinamese descent
Plus-size models
People from Heerlen
Women Management models
1993 births
IMG Models models